Paul Gordon Baxter (born October 28, 1955) is a Canadian former ice hockey defenceman who played in the World Hockey Association from 1974 to 1979, the National Hockey League from 1979 to 1987. He featured in the 1986 Stanley Cup Finals with the Calgary Flames. He then worked as an assistant coach for eleven seasons.

Playing career
Before his major league career, Baxter played junior ice hockey for Winnipeg in the Western Canada Hockey League (WCHL). The Cleveland Crusaders of the World Hockey Association (WHA) drafted the Winnipeg-born Baxter in the first round as the 11th overall pick of the 1974 WHA Amateur Draft, and signed him that July. The following year he was drafted by the Pittsburgh Penguins of the National Hockey League (NHL) in the third round as the 49th overall pick of the 1975 NHL Amateur Draft. Baxter joined the Quebec Nordiques of the WHA in 1976, and when the Nordiques joined the NHL, Baxter was made a priority selection by Quebec, preventing Pittsburgh from reclaiming him. He played a year in the NHL with the Nordiques, and later spent three years with the Penguins and another four with the Calgary Flames. He retired from the NHL after 470 games, recording a total of 48 goals, 121 assists, 169 points, and 1564 penalty minutes. Baxter is the all-time leader in penalty minutes for the WHA with 962, and is also the single-season leader for the Pittsburgh Penguins with 409 during the 1981–82 season.

Coaching career
Baxter continued his career as a coach, joining the Salt Lake Golden Eagles of the International Hockey League (IHL) to the Turner Cup title in 1987-88. He went on to become the assistant coach of multiple NHL clubs, including the Calgary Flames when they won the 1989 Stanley Cup.

Baxter coached the Wenatchee Wild of the North American Hockey League (NAHL) from 2008 until November 2010, leading the team to two division titles and a berth in the Robertson Cup in 2009. He then went to the Wichita Falls Wildcats of the NAHL as head coach, general manager, and part owner in May 2011. He left his operational positions with the Wildcats in October 2016 while remaining part owner. The team ceased operations at the end of the season.

Coaching history
1987–1989: Salt Lake Golden Eagles (IHL) head coach
1989–1992: Calgary Flames (NHL) assistant coach
1992–1995: Chicago Blackhawks (NHL) assistant coach
1995–1997: Saint John Flames (AHL) head coach
1997–2000: San Jose Sharks (NHL) assistant coach
2001–2003: Florida Panthers (NHL) assistant coach
2006-2008: HIFK SM-liiga (Finland) head coach
2008-2010: Wenatchee Wild (NAHL) head coach
2011–2014: Wichita Falls Wildcats (NAHL) head coach

Personal life
Baxter and his wife currently live in Tennessee. Baxter has four children.

Career statistics

Regular season and playoffs

Awards and achievements
Honoured Member of the Manitoba Hockey Hall of Fame

References

External links
 
 Profile at hockeydraftcentral.com

1955 births
Living people
Calgary Flames coaches
Calgary Flames players
Canadian ice hockey coaches
Canadian ice hockey defencemen
Cape Codders players
Chicago Blackhawks coaches
Cleveland Crusaders draft picks
Cleveland Crusaders players
Florida Panthers coaches
Maine Nordiques players
Pittsburgh Penguins draft picks
Pittsburgh Penguins players
Quebec Nordiques (WHA) players
Quebec Nordiques players
San Jose Sharks coaches
Ice hockey people from Winnipeg
Syracuse Blazers players
Winnipeg Clubs players
Winnipeg Monarchs players
World Hockey Association first round draft picks